In molecular biology, transcription factor DP (Dimerization Partner) is a family of proteins which function as transcription factors.
DP forms a heterodimer with E2F and regulates genes involved in cell cycle progression. The transcriptional activity of E2F is inhibited by the retinoblastoma protein which binds to the E2F-DP heterodimer  and negatively regulates the G1-S transition.

See also

E2F
TFDP1
TFDP2

References

Protein domains